The 2016 Total Spa 24 Hours was the 68th running of the Spa 24 Hours. It was also the fourth round of the 2016 Blancpain GT Series Endurance Cup and was held on 30 and 31 July at the Circuit de Spa-Francorchamps, Belgium.

The race was won by ROWE Racing and drivers Philipp Eng, Maxime Martin and Alexander Sims. The trio's No. 99 BMW M6 GT3 finished just shy of two minutes clear of AKKA ASP and their No. 88 Mercedes-AMG GT3, driven by Felix Rosenqvist, Tristan Vautier and Renger van der Zande. Completing the podium in third place was the No. 28 Belgian Audi Club Team WRT Audi R8 LMS of Nico Müller, René Rast and Laurens Vanthoor, five seconds behind second place.

Race result

References

Spa 24 Hours
Spa
Spa
24 Hours of Spa
24